Huntingdon County Career and Technology Center (HCCTC) is a small rural vocational school that serves the area around Huntingdon County, Pennsylvania. Its classes are open to 10th graders to 12th graders in local high schools and in special circumstances to 9th graders. A satellite campus of Pennsylvania Highlands Community College is also located inside the building.

Career and Technology Center
The Huntingdon County Career and Technology Center is large one building location on 11893 Technology Drive, Mill Creek, PA 17060.

It was formerly called Huntingdon County Area Vocational-Technical (Vo-Tech) School until the late-1990s (around 96–97) and then renamed the Huntingdon County Career and Technology Center.

Associate districts

References

External links
 

Schools in Huntingdon County, Pennsylvania
Vocational education in the United States
Public high schools in Pennsylvania